Douglas Hubbard is a management consultant, speaker, and author in decision sciences and actuarial science.

Career
Hubbard was a business analyst at Coopers & Lybrand in 1988 after finishing his MBA at the University of South Dakota.  He formed Hubbard Decision Research in 1998.

Views
He is critical of several popular methods and standards in risk management and decision making in organizations.  He argues that extensive research in methods such as "risk matrices", the use of weighted scores in decision making, and expert intuition are inferior to certain quantitative methods.

Hubbard is known for asserting that everything can be measured, and that initial measurements are the most valuable as they reduce the greatest amounts of uncertainty.

Selected publications

Books 

 
 
 
 

His first two books are listed on the Book List for the Society of Actuaries Exam Prep.

His books are on the reading list at School of Business and Economics (College of Charleston), Jon M. Huntsman School of Business (Utah State University), and Carl H. Lindner College of Business (University of Cincinnati).

Other publications 

Shepherd, K., Hubbard, D., Fenton, N., Claxton, K., Luedeling, E., & deLeeuw, J. (2015). Policy: Development goals should enable decision-making. Nature. July 2015. https://doi.org/10.1038/523152a
Hubbard, D., & Evans, D. (2010). Problems with scoring methods and ordinal scales in risk assessment. IBM Journal of Research and Development, 54(3), 2–1. doi.org/10.1147/jrd.2010.2042914 
Hubbard, D., & Samuelson, D. A. (2009). Analysis placebos: The difference between perceived and real benefits of risk analysis and decision models.  Analytics Magazine. Fall 2009.
Hubbard, D., & Samuelson, D. A. (2009). Modeling Without Measurements: How the decision analysis culture's lack of empiricism reduces its effectiveness. OR/MS Today, 36(5), 26–31.
Hubard, D. (2009). It's all an illusion: The perception that many things are immeasurable is common — it's also an illusion. ArchitectureBoston. 11(5). 
Hubbard, D. (2003). Expert analysis: An effective measure. CIO: ROIowa. August 2003.
Mayor, T., & Hubbard, D. (2001). Case study: Red light, green light. CIO Enterprise Magazine. October, 2001.
Worthen, B., & Hubbard., D. (2001). Case Study: Two Teams are better than one. CIO Enterprise Magazine. 2001.
 Hubbard, D. W. (1997). Risk vs. return. InformationWeek, (637), 105.

Awards 

 2017 PaloAlto Networks Cybersecurity Canon Award
2017 Royal Society of Arts, Manufactures and Commerce Fellow

References 

American economics writers
American accountants
21st-century American non-fiction writers
University of South Dakota alumni
Living people
Year of birth missing (living people)
Place of birth missing (living people)
Nationality missing
Risk management
Risk analysis methodologies